Tacoma Opera is a professional opera company located in Tacoma, WA and is a member of OPERA America. The company presents two to three operas a year. The 2015-16 season includes Don Giovanni, Die Fledermaus, and  The Threepenny Opera.

History 
Tacoma Opera was founded in 1968. While the company initially enjoyed several years of success, the company folded in the late 1970s. In 1981, Hans Wolf, then director of community outreach for Seattle Opera, successfully rebounded the company with the help of Pacific Lutheran University's then dean Richard Moe and the PLU fine arts staff. Wolf then served as the company's general director until the late 1990s, during which time Tacoma Opera produced several premieres, including the West Coast premiere of Offenbach's Christopher Columbus and the world premiere of Seattle composer Carol Sams' The Pied Piper of Hamelin. The current general director is Noel Koran, who succeeded Kathryn Smith in 2011.

References

External links
 November 2007 News Tribune Article
 March 2008 Tacoma Weekly Article
 March 2008 News Tribune Article

American opera companies
Musical groups established in 1968
Performing arts in Washington (state)
Culture of Tacoma, Washington
Organizations based in Tacoma, Washington